Garzia is the Italianized form of the Spanish name Garcia. Notable people with the name include:
Garzia de' Medici (1547–1562), the subject of a famous painting by Bronzino
Eleonora di Garzia di Toledo (1553–1576), Italian nobility
Giovanni Garzia Mellini (1562–1629), Italian prelate of the Catholic Church
Albert Garzia (born 1977), Maltese composer, musician and music teacher
Ralph Garzia (1921–2009), American politician

Italian-language surnames